Armaghetto is the second studio album by American hip hop duo Channel Live. It was released on July 18, 2000 through Flavor Unit Records. Recording sessions took place at Studio 57 and at the Weight Room in New York. Production was handled by Mike City, Poison Ivy, Buddah, Shamello, Chuckie Madness, and Channel Live themselves. It features guest appearances from Akbar, Benny Boom, Carl Thomas, Black Opz, Black Rob, Malik Yusef, Method Man, Ms. Toi, Rowdy Rahz and Spanish Fly. The album itself failed to make it to the US Billboard charts, but the single "Wild Out 2K" did make it to No. 48 on the Hot Rap Singles chart.

Track listing

Personnel

Hakim Green – main artist, producer (tracks: 11, 14)
Vincent "Tuffy" Morgan – main artist, producer (tracks: 11, 14)
Black Opz – featured artist (track 4)
Carl Thomas – featured artist (tracks: 5, 9)
Robert "Black Rob" Ross – featured artist (track 6)
Toikeon "Ms. Toi" Parham – featured artist (track 8)
Akbar Youngblood – featured artist (tracks: 10, 12)
Clarence "Benny Boom" Douglas – featured artist (tracks: 10, 13)
F. "Spanish Fly" Elliot – featured artist (track 10)
Clifford "Method Man" Smith – featured artist (track 11)
Rashon "Rowdy Rahz" Brinson – featured artist (track 11)
Malik Yusef – featured artist (track 11)
Michael "Mike City" Flowers – producer (tracks: 1, 2, 5, 6, 10, 12, 13)
Poison Ivy – producer (tracks: 3, 4)
Charles "Chuckie Madness" Shaw – producer (track 7)
Roger "Buddah" Munroe – producer (tracks: 8, 9)
Darrol "Shamello" Durant – producer (tracks: 8, 9)
Dana "Queen Latifah" Owens – additional vocals (track 6), executive producer
Sha-Kim Compere – executive producer
Hernan Santiago – recording (tracks: 1-7, 9-14), mixing (tracks: 1, 3, 4, 6, 7, 9-14)
Patrick Dillett – mixing (track 2)
Steve Sisco – engineering assistant (track 2)
David Kennedy – mixing (track 8)
Darryl "Latee" French – co-executive producer
Dedra Tate – co-executive producer

References

External links

2000 albums
Channel Live albums